Tumor-associated calcium signal transducer (TACSTD) is the name of two human proteins and the genes that encode them:

 Tumor-associated calcium signal transducer 1 (Epithelial cell adhesion molecule, EpCAM)
 Tumor-associated calcium signal transducer 2